Museum of Man may refer to:
 Indira Gandhi Rashtriya Manav Sangrahalaya, Bhopal, Madhya Pradesh, India
 Canadian Museum of History, Gatineau, Quebec, Canada (formerly the "Museum of Man")
 Lowell D. Holmes Museum of Anthropology, of Wichita State University, in Kansas, USA (formerly named the Museum of Man)
 Musée de l'Homme (English: "Museum of Man"), Paris, France
 Museum of Us, anthropology and pre-Columbian museum in San Diego, California (formerly named "San Diego Museum of Man")

See also
 Manitoba Museum of Man and Nature, Winnipeg, Manitoba, Canada
 :Category:Museums in the Isle of Man
 Museum of Man and the Environment in the Palazzo Pretorio of Terra del Sole in Italy
 Museum of Man and Nature, Munich, Bavaria
 Museum of the Mountain Man, Pinedale, Wyoming, USA